Catocala columbina is a moth of the family Erebidae. It is found in Sichuan, Zhejiang, Taiwan and Japan.

Subspecies
Catocala columbina columbina
Catocala columbina okurai Sugi, 1965 (Taiwan)
Catocala columbina yoshihikoi Ishizuka, 2002 (Japan)

References

External links
Catocala columbina yoshihikoi info

columbina
Moths of Asia
Moths described in 1900